The  was the hereditary peerage of the Empire of Japan, which existed between 1869 and 1947. They succeeded the feudal lords and court nobles, but were abolished with the 1947 constitution.

Kazoku (華族) should not be confused with "kazoku (家族)", which is pronounced the same in Japanese, but with a different character reading that means "immediate family" (as in the film Kazoku above).

Origins 

They lost their territorial privileges. Itō Hirobumi, one of the principal authors of the Meiji constitution, intended the new  peerage to serve as a political and social bulwark for the "restored" emperor and the Japanese imperial institution.

All members of the  without an official government appointment in the provinces were initially obliged to reside in Tokyo. The stipends promised by the government were eventually replaced by government bonds.

Development 
 
 
 
 
 

The initial rank distribution for  houses of  descent depended on the highest possible office to which its ancestors had been entitled in the imperial court.

Thus the head of the -ranked Sanjo house became a prince in 1884. The heads of the Tokudaiji and the Saionji houses were advanced to the rank of prince from the rank of marquess in 1911 and 1920, respectively. 

Nakayama Tadayasu, the Meiji Emperor's maternal grandfather and also from an -ranked family, was ennobled as a marquess. The head of the Shō family, the former royal family of the Ryūkyū Kingdom (Okinawa), was given the title of marquess. When the Korean Empire was annexed in 1910, the House of Yi was mediatized as an incorporated and therefore .

Excluding the Tokugawas, the initial  rank distribution for the former  lords depended on rice revenue: those with 150,000  or more became marquesses, those with 50,000  or more become counts, and those with holdings rated below 50,000  became viscounts. The head of the Tokugawa clan, Tokugawa Iesato, became a prince, the heads of primary Tokugawa branch houses became marquesses, the heads of the secondary branches became counts and the heads of more distant branches became viscounts. The head of the Matsudaira (Fukui Domain) branch was raised to the rank of marquess from the rank of count in 1888. In 1902, the former  Tokugawa Yoshinobu was created a prince, and the head of the Mito  house was raised to the same rank, prince, in 1929.

Of the other former  clans, the heads of the Mōri (Chōshū Domain) and Shimazu (Satsuma Domain) clans were both ennobled as princes in 1884 for their role in the Meiji Restoration; the Yamauchi (Tosa Domain) clan was given the rank of marquess. The heads of the main Asano (Hiroshima Domain), Ikeda (Okayama and Tottori Domains), Kuroda (Fukuoka Domain), Satake (Kubota Domain), Nabeshima (Saga Domain), Hachisuka (Tokushima Domain), Hosokawa (Kumamoto Domain) and Maeda (Kaga Domain) clans became marquesses in 1884. 

Notably, the head of the main family line of the Date clan, which had formerly ruled the extensive Sendai Domain, was only ennobled as a count and was thus denied a hereditary seat in the House of Peers; this was likely due to the domain's prominent role as the leader of a coalition against the Imperial forces during the Boshin War. In 1891, the head of the Date-Uwajima family (Uwajima Domain), a cadet branch of the clan which had remained loyal to the Emperor during the conflict, was raised to the rank of marquess, having been ennobled as a count in 1884.

Many of those who had significant roles in the Meiji Restoration, or their heirs, were ennobled. Ito Hirobumi and Yamagata Aritomo were ennobled as counts in 1884, promoted to marquesses in 1895 and finally became princes in 1907. The heirs of Okubo Toshimichi and Kido Takayoshi, two of the three great nobles of the Meiji Restoration, were ennobled as marquesses in 1884, followed by the heirs of samurai general-politician Saigō Takamori in 1902.

Succession and numbers

The holders of the top two ranks, prince and marquess, automatically became members of the House of Peers in the Diet of Japan upon their succession or upon majority (in the case of peers who were minors). Counts, viscounts and barons elected up to 150 representatives from their ranks to sit in the House of Peers.

 
Under the Peerage Act of 7 July 1884, pushed through by Home Minister and future first Prime Minister Itō Hirobumi after visiting Europe, the Meiji government expanded the hereditary peerage with the award of  status to persons regarded as having performed distinguished public services to the nation. The government also divided the  into five ranks explicitly based on the British peerage, but with titles deriving from the ancient Chinese nobility.

Usually, though not always, titles and hereditary financial stipends passed according to primogeniture. Unlike in European peerage systems, but following traditional Japanese custom, illegitimate sons could succeed to titles and estates. To prevent their lineages from dying out, heads of  houses could (and frequently did) adopt sons from collateral branches of their own houses, whether in the male or female lines of descent, and from other  houses whether related or not. 

Unlike European custom, the adopted heir of a peer could succeed to a title ahead of a more senior heir in terms of primogeniture. A 1904 amendment to the 1889 Imperial Household Law allowed minor princes of the imperial family to renounce their imperial status and become peers (in their own right) or heirs to childless peers.
 
Initially there were 11 non-imperial princes, 24 marquesses, 76 counts, 324 viscounts and 74 barons, for a total of 509 peers. By 1928, through promotions and new creations, there were a total of 954 peers: 18 non-imperial princes, 40 marquesses, 108 counts, 379 viscounts and 409 barons. The  reached a peak of 1016 families in 1944.

Since the end of the war, many descendants of the  families continue to occupy prominent roles in Japanese society and industry.

The , or Peers' Club, was the association of the high nobility. It had its headquarters in the  building.

See also

Notes

References

External links 
 Some Information on Nobility, Peerage and Ranks in Ancient and Meiji Japan—Information on Japanese nobility with additional sources

 
1884 establishments in Japan
1947 disestablishments in Japan
Japanese historical terms
Japanese nobility
Japanese words and phrases
Meiji Restoration
Politics of the Empire of Japan